Darling were a British band from the late 1970s, whose music was a mixture of new wave and pop music. The band's singer, Alice Spring, had been the vocalist of the band Slack Alice on their eponymously titled album of 1974, and had a career as pop singer Sandra Barry in the 1960s. Drummer Paul Varley had been the percussionist and a founder member of the well-known band Arrows. Vocalist Alice Spring and bassist Mick Howard came from the 70's London RnB + Rock group Slack Alice.

In 1979, Darling released their first and only album, Put It Down to Experience, with Charisma Records.

After the album release, the band broke up. Only the guitarist, the until then unknown Hal Lindes, continued with a musical career of any note – first as a member of Dire Straits and more recently as a soundtrack composer for British television and American movies.

Members
 Mick Howard – bass guitar
 Hal Lindes – guitar
 Alice Spring – vocals
 Paul Varley – drums

Discography
Put It Down to Experience (1979)

References

External links

British pop music groups
English rock music groups
Musical groups from London
Musical groups established in 1978